The Brazilian Telecommunications Society is a scientific academy of Brazil. Created in 1983 with no competing financial interest, it is devoted to promoting the diffusion, the development and the interchange of ideas and results in the field of Telecommunications. The SBrT is co-sister society of the IEEE Communications Society. The meetings and conferences sponsored by SBrT are now a forum for scientific, technological debate.

The SBrT holds an annual scientific congress, the Brazilian Telecommunication Symposium (Simpósio Brasileiro de Telecomunicações), and each four years, the International Telecommunication Symposium – ITS (joint with IEEE).

It publishes the scientific journal – The Journal of Communication and Information Systems (JCIS), co-sponsored by the IEEE Communications Society. The SBrT also publishes the  «Série Brasport», a series of textbooks on Telecommunications and correlated fields.

External links
 http://www.sbrt.org.br/  Society homepage (Portuguese)
 https://web.archive.org/web/20150623063854/http://www6.fee.unicamp.br/ojs/index.php/JCIS Journal of Communication and Information Systems
 https://web.archive.org/web/20070809081358/http://iecom.dee.ufcg.edu.br/~jcis/  Journal of Communication and Information Systems (old issues)

See also
 Brazilian science and technology

Scientific societies based in Brazil
Telecommunications in Brazil